is a Quasi-National Park on the Genkai coast of Fukuoka Prefecture, Saga Prefecture, and Nagasaki Prefecture, Japan.

See also

 List of national parks of Japan

References

National parks of Japan
Parks and gardens in Fukuoka Prefecture
Parks and gardens in Saga Prefecture
Parks and gardens in Nagasaki Prefecture
Protected areas established in 1956